Epi-isozizaene 5-monooxygenase (CYP170A1) is an enzyme with systematic name (+)-epi-isozizaene,NADPH:oxygen oxidoreductase (5-hydroxylating). This enzyme catalyses the following chemical reaction

 (+)-epi-isozizaene + 2 NADPH + 2 H+ + 2 O2  albaflavenone + 2 NADP+ + 3 H2O (overall reaction)
(1a) (+)-epi-isozizaene + NADPH + H+ + O2  (5S)-albaflavenol + NADP+ + H2O
(1b) (5S)-albaflavenol + NADPH + H+ + O2  albaflavenone + NADP+ + 2 H2O
(2a) (+)-epi-isozizaene + NADPH + H+ + O2  (5R)-albaflavenol + NADP+ + H2O
(2b) (5R)-albaflavenol + NADPH + H+ + O2  albaflavenone + NADP+ + 2 H2O

This cytochrome P450 enzyme is purified from bacterium Streptomyces coelicolor.

References

External links 
 

EC 1.14.13